Garay, de Garay or Garai is a Basque or a Hungarian surname. Notable people with the name include:

 Antonio Garay (born 1979), American NFL football player
 Blasco de Garay (1500–1552), Spanish navy captain and inventor
 Carlos Garay (born 1972), American football player
 Cecilia Suárez de Garay (born 1971), Mexican actress
 Ezequiel Garay (born 1986), Argentine football player
 Fernanda Garay (born 1986), Brazilian volleyball player
 Francisco de Garay  (died 1523), Spanish conquistador, governor of Jamaica and explorer 
 Hugo Garay (born 1980), Argentine light heavyweight boxer
 János Garay (1812–1853), Hungarian writer and poet
 János Garay (fencer) (1889-1945), Hungarian saber fencer
 Jesús Garay (1930–1995), Spanish football defender
 Jesús Garay (director) (born 1949), Spanish film director and screenwriter
 Joaquin Garay III (born 1968), American actor
 José Marcos Garay (born 1977), Mexican football player
 Juan Carlos Garay (born 1968), Ecuadorian football player
 Juan de Garay (1528–1583), Spanish conquistador
 Kenneth Garay, American sports journalist
 Leslie Andrew Garay (born 1924), American botanist
 Máximo Garay (1898–1960), Hungarian naturalized Chilean football manager
 Melker Garay (born 1966), Swedish author
 Nicole Garay (1873–1928), Panamanian poet
 Ramón Garay (1896–1956), Spanish film actor
 Ridl Garay (born 1997), Mexican volleyball player
 Sebastián Garay (born 1983), Argentine singer, musician and composer of Argentine
 Sindo Garay (1867–1968), Cuban singer and composer
 Soo Garay, Canadian actress
 Tibor Garay (born 1923), Hungarian football player
 Val Garay (born 1942), American record producer
 Garay Asadov (1923–1944), Azerbaijani Red Army sergeant
 Pedro Raul (born 1996), Brazilian footballer

Basque-language surnames